The Central American Integration System (or SICA) has been the economic and political organization of Central American states since 1 February 1993. On 13 December 1991, the ODECA countries (Spanish: Organización de Estados Centroamericanos) signed the Protocol of Tegucigalpa, extending earlier cooperation for regional peace, political freedom, democracy and economic development. SICA's General Secretariat is in El Salvador.

In 1991, SICA's institutional framework included Guatemala, El Salvador, Honduras, Nicaragua, Costa Rica and Panama. Belize joined in 1998 as a full member, while the Dominican Republic became an associated state in 2004 and a full member in 2013. Mexico, Chile and Brazil became part of the organization as regional observers, and the Republic of China, Spain, Germany, Georgia and Japan became extra-regional observers. SICA has a standing invitation to participate as observers in sessions of the United Nations General Assembly, and maintains offices at UN Headquarters.

Four countries (Guatemala, El Salvador, Honduras, and Nicaragua) experiencing political, cultural and migratory integration have formed a group, the Central America Four or CA-4, which has introduced common internal borders and the same type of passport. Belize, Costa Rica, Panama and the Dominican Republic subsequently joined the CA-4 for economic integration.

Headquarters
SICA was supported by the United Nations General Assembly in its resolution A/48L of 10 December 1993. The administrative centre
is located in San Salvador, El Salvador. SICA is affiliated with the UN.

History

First Central American Court of Justice
Between 14 November and 20 December 1907, after a proposal by Mexico and the United States, five Central American nations (Costa Rica, El Salvador, Guatemala, Honduras and Nicaragua) took part in the Central American Peace Conference in Washington, D.C. sponsored by United States Secretary of State Elihu Root. The five nations, all former Spanish colonies, had previously tried to form a political alliance. Their first attempt was the Federal Republic of Central America, and the most recent effort was the founding of the Republic of Central America 11 years earlier.

The participants concluded the conference with an agreement creating the Central American Court of Justice (Corte de Justicia Centroamericana). The court would remain in effect for ten years from the final ratification, and communication would be through the government of Costa Rica. It was composed of five judges, one from each member state. The court heard ten cases, five of which were brought by private individuals (and declared inadmissible) and three begun by the court. The court operated until April 1918 from its headquarters in Costa Rica; despite efforts beginning in March 1917 (when Nicaragua submitted a notice of termination of the agreement), it then dissolved.

Reasons for the agreement's failure include:
No effective system of judicial procedure
Judges were not independent of their respective governments.
Jurisdiction was too broad to satisfy its member states.

Organization of Central American States

At the end of World War II, interest in integrating the Central American governments began. On 14 October 1951 (33 years after the CACJ was dissolved) the governments of Costa Rica, El Salvador, Guatemala, Honduras and Nicaragua signed a treaty creating the Organization of Central American States (Organización de Estados Centroamericanos, or ODECA) to promote regional cooperation and unity. The following year (12 December 1952), ODECA's charter was amended to create a new Central American Court of Justice (Corte Centroamericana de Justicia, or CCJ) without the time limit of its previous incarnation.

The Charter of San Salvador was ratified by all Central American governments, and on 18 August 1955 their foreign ministers attended its first meeting in Antigua Guatemala. The Declaration of Antigua Guatemala authorized subordinate organizations of ODECA to facilitate economic cooperation, better sanitation and progress in the "integral union" of the Central American nations.

The Central American Common Market, the Central American Bank for Economic Integration (BCIE) and the Secretariat for Central American Economic Integration (SIECA) were established by the five Central American nations on 13 December 1960 at a conference in Managua. All nations ratified the membership treaties the following year. Costa Rica joined the CACM in 1963, but Panama had not yet joined. The organization froze during the 1969 war between Honduras and El Salvador; in 1973 ODECA was suspended, and progress toward regional integration ground to a halt.

Revival

In 1991 the integration agenda advanced with the creation of the SICA, which provided a legal framework to resolve disputes between member states. SICA includes seven Central America nations and the Dominican Republic, which is part of the Caribbean. Central America has several supranational institutions, such as the Central American Parliament, the Central American Bank for Economic Integration and the Central American Common Market. The Central America trade bloc is governed by the General Treaty for Economical Integration (the Guatemala Protocol), which was signed on 29 October 1993. The CACM has removed duties on most products throughout the member countries, and has unified external tariffs and increased trade within its members. The bank has five non-regional members: Argentina, Colombia, Mexico, the Republic of China and Spain.

All SICA members are also part of the Mesoamerica Project, which includes Mexico and Colombia. Haiti joined SICA in 2013 as an associate member, and the Dominican Republic became a full member on 27 June 2013.

Members and observers

Regional observers

Extra-regional observers

Economic integration

Unified Central American currency
The Central American Bank for Economic Integration has not introduced its own common currency, and dollarization is possible. However, for formal purposes the US Dollar is sometimes referred to as "Central American Peso" pegged 1:1 to the Dollar. There are no coins or notes in this currency and it is little known outside of legal circles. Central America is increasing its regional economic development, accelerating its social, political and economic integration. The region has diversified output and price and wage flexibility; however, there is a lack of business-cycle synchronization, dissimilar levels of public-sector debt, diverging inflation rates and low levels of intra-regional trade.

Policy integration
In the parliamentary body are proposals to consider regional air travel as domestic travel, to eliminate roaming fees on telephone calls and to create a regional penitentiary (affiliated with the Central American Court of Justice) to address regional trafficking and international crimes.

Institutions

Central American Parliament 

Parlacen was born as a parliamentary body emulating the Federal Republic of Central America, with Costa Rica an observer. It evolved from the Contadora Group, a project launched during the 1980s to deal with civil wars in El Salvador, Guatemala and Nicaragua. Although the Contadora Group was dissolved in 1986, the concept of Central American integration is implicitly referenced in several countries' constitutions. The Esquipulas Peace Agreement (among other acts) agreed to the creation of a Central American Parliament composed of 20–22 directly-elected deputies from each country. Costa Rica has not ratified the agreement, and is not represented in the Parlacen. Parlacen is seen by some (including former President of Honduras Ricardo Maduro) as a white elephant.

Central American Court of Justice 
The CCJ's mission is to promote peace in the region and the unity of its member states. The Court has jurisdiction to hear cases:
Between member states
Between a member state and a non-member state accepting the court's jurisdiction
Between states and a resident of a member state
Concerning the integration process between SICA and member states (or persons)

The court may offer consultation to the region's supreme courts. In 2005, it ruled that Nicaraguan congressional reforms (which removed control of water, energy and telecommunications from President Enrique Bolaños) were "legally inapplicable". As of July 2005, the CCJ had made 70 resolutions since hearing its first case in 1994.

Organizations

 Central American Bank for Economic Integration (Banco Centroamericano de Integración Económica, BCIE)
 Central American Common Market (CACM; Mercado Común Centroamericano, MCCA)
 Central American Court of Justice (CCJ)
 Central American Armed Forces Conference (Conferencia de las Fuerzas Armadas Centroamericanas, CFAC)
 Central American Parliament (Parlamento Centroamericano, PARLACEN)
 Plenum
 Board of Parliament
 Secretariat
 President's Summit
 Comité Consultivo (CC-SICA)
 Council of Ministers of Foreign Affairs
 Executive Committee (CE-SICA)
 Vice President's Summit
 Secretariat General (SG-SICA)
 Central American Educational and Cultural Cooperation (CECC)

See also
 Latin American Integration Association
 Central America-4 Border Control Agreement
 Central America-4 passport
 Mercosur
Rules of Origin
Market access
Free-trade area
Tariffs

References

Bibliography

Ishmael, Odeen (July 2007). Guyana Journal (2007-07): Advancing Integration Between Caricom and Central America
Kimitch, Rebecca (15 July 2005). Commission Studies Impeachment, Tico Times.

External links
Central American Integration System
Central American Parliament
Central American Economic Integration System
BCIE / CABEI
Decisions of the CACJ in English (1908-1917)
Market Access Map (A free tool developed by International Trade Centre, which identify customs tariffs, tariff rate quotas, trade remedies, regulatory requirements and preferential regimes applicable to products, including Central American Integration System)
Rules of Origin Facilitator (A free tool jointly developed by International Trade Centre, World Trade Organization and World Customs Organization which enables traders to find specific criteria and general origin requirements applicable to their products, understand and comply with them in order to be eligible for preferential tariffs. The tool is very useful for traders who want to gain benefit from Central American Integration System)

Continental unions
International organizations based in the Americas
Multilateral development banks
Foreign relations of Costa Rica
Foreign relations of El Salvador
Foreign relations of Guatemala
Foreign relations of Honduras
Foreign relations of Nicaragua
Foreign relations of the Dominican Republic
Supranational unions
Trade blocs
United Nations General Assembly observers
Politics of Central America
Central America-4 Border Control Agreement
Organizations established in 1991
Intergovernmental organizations established by treaty
Organizations based in El Salvador
1991 in economics
1991 establishments in North America
Customs unions